Desmond Daniel (19 January 1943 – 2 March 2015) was a South African cricketer. He played nine first-class matches for Orange Free State between 1966 and 1968.

References

External links
 

1943 births
2015 deaths
South African cricketers
Free State cricketers